Hill College, Tadubi, established in 1978, is a general degree college in Tadubi, Senapati District, Manipur. It offers undergraduate courses in arts. It is affiliated to  Manipur University.

Departments

Arts
History
Economics
Education
Political Science

Accreditation
The college is recognized by the University Grants Commission (UGC).

See also
List of institutions of higher education in Manipur

References

External links

Colleges affiliated to Manipur University
Educational institutions established in 1978
Universities and colleges in Manipur
1978 establishments in Manipur